Teodora Simović (born 27 October 1993) is a Serbian long distance runner. She competed in the women's marathon at the 2017 World Championships in Athletics.

References

External links
 

1993 births
Living people
Serbian female long-distance runners
Serbian female marathon runners
World Athletics Championships athletes for Serbia
Place of birth missing (living people)